Slabada (formerly , , see sloboda) is a village in Kėdainiai district municipality, in Kaunas County, in central Lithuania. According to the 2011 census, the village was uninhabited.

History
At the beginning of the 20th century here was a folwark of the Digraičiai manor.

Demography

Notable people
Valdas Sirutkaitis (b. 1952), Lithuanian physicist.

References

Villages in Kaunas County
Kėdainiai District Municipality